Lam Chi railway station is a railway station located in Kho Kho Subdistrict, Mueang Surin District, Surin Province. It is the location of a TPI Polene cement rail distribution center.

References 

Railway stations in Thailand
Surin province